The jazz album United Notions with Toshiko and her International Jazz Sextet was recorded in New York in 1958 and released on the Metrojazz label. The recording features pianist Toshiko Akiyoshi with Nat Adderley or Doc Severinsen alternating on cornet/trumpet, Bobby Jaspar playing tenor and baritone saxophone and flute, Rolf Kühn on alto saxophone and clarinet, René Thomas on guitar, Bert Dale on drums and John Drew on bass.

The album has been reissued on CD by the Spanish label Fresh Sound. The cover of this issue includes a photograph of Doc Severinsen, the only player whose photo was not included on the original MetroJazz LP cover.

Track listing
LP side A
"Broadway" (Bird, McRae, Woode) – 6:48
"Sukiyaki" (Jaspar) – 6:30
"Swingin' Till the Girls Come Home" (Pettiford) – 6:50
LP side B
"United Notions" (Akiyoshi) – 6:19
"Civilized Folk" (Freedman) – 4:15
"Strike Up the Band" (G. Gershwin, I. Gershwin) – 4:24
"Jane" (Freedman) – 4:16

Personnel
Toshiko Akiyoshi – piano
Nat Adderley – cornet (tracks A1, 2, 3, B2)
Doc Severinsen – trumpet (tracks B1, 3, 4) 
Bobby Jaspar – tenor saxophone, flute, baritone saxophone
Rolf Kühn – alto saxophone, clarinet
René Thomas – guitar
Bert Dale (Nils-Bertil Dahlander) – drums
John Drew – bass

References / External links
Metrojazz E-1001, Metrojazz (US) SE1001, Metrojazz (J) MM2087, Metrojazz (J) KI7809,  Metrojazz (J) POJJ1570
Fresh Sound Records FSRCD 1636
United Notions at [ Allmusic.com]
René Thomas Discography

Specific

Toshiko Akiyoshi albums
1958 albums
MetroJazz Records albums